is a horizontally scrolling shooter arcade video game released by Namco in 1985. It runs on Namco Pac-Land hardware but with a video system like that used in Dragon Buster. It is also the first game from Namco to allow two players to play simultaneously. The game was later released on the Famicom (brought to the American Nintendo Entertainment System by Sunsoft), and both this version for the Wii, Nintendo 3DS, and Wii U and the original arcade version for the Wii were later released on Nintendo's Virtual Console service, and for the Nintendo Switch and PlayStation 4 as part of Hamster's Arcade Archives line of digital releases. The NES version was also ported to arcades for the Nintendo VS. System as VS. Super Sky Kid, but promotional materials and the cabinet for this version just use the name VS. Sky Kid. 

A sequel named Sky Kid Deluxe was released in 1986. It introduced several new enemies and missions, and was the first game to run on Namco's then-new Namco System 86 hardware.

Gameplay
Sky Kid is a two-dimensional scrolling shooter game. The players take control of the Sky Kids, "Red Baron" and "Blue Max", which are references to Manfred von Richthofen, the famous World War I flying ace, and the prestigious order Pour le Mérite informally known as Blue Max. The Sky Kids fly around in biplanes and are assigned specific targets during the missions. These missions involve bombing specific targets. The "A" button is used to control the plane's machine gun and the "B" button is used to perform a loop. A number of obstacles face the players in each level. First, their biplane is not equipped with a bomb to complete their mission and must be picked up en route to the target. Second, there are both ground and air units that attempt to keep the Sky Kids from accomplishing their mission. Last, the Sky Kids may have to navigate through some very inhospitable terrain or navigate around cities in order to get to the target. The targets which the Sky Kids must bomb will either be fortress complexes, or ships. As the players advance further up in the 21 missions, multiple targets will begin to appear in the course of one mission. Players receive points for destroying air and ground targets, and receive additional points at the end of the mission for how many of these types of targets are destroyed. In addition, players get points based on how much of the target is destroyed - but only total destruction warrants an end-of-mission bonus.

Occasionally, performing a loop over a billboard will reveal one of four hidden Namco characters: Pac-Man, Inky, the Special Flag from Rally-X (which, like the Galaxian flagship, has appeared in several other Namco games) or Pooka from Dig Dug.

If the player performs a loop in front of the three dancing girls which appear at the end of each mission, the girls will send out hearts representing kisses. If the player should shoot the girls, or hearts, they will turn into pink powder puffs and waving dogs respectively.

Reception

In Japan, Game Machine listed Sky Kid on their January 15, 1986 issue as being the second most-successful table arcade unit of the month.

Other appearances in media
 Sky Kid was briefly resurrected as a webcomic strip, part of Bandai Namco's ShiftyLook line featuring artwork done by Udon Entertainment. The strip focuses on the exploits of the game's two protagonists, Red Baron and Blue Max.
 Blue Max, known as "Sky Kid", also appears as a recurring character in the ShiftyLook animated series Mappy: The Beat. Sky Kid is a good-natured, but unhelpful and stupid employee of Nyamco who speaks with a Southern accent, and often unintentionally gets on Mappy and Dig Dug's nerves.
 A theme based on Sky Kid is featured in Pac-Man 99, as special DLC.
 The Ace Combat series has multiple references to Sky Kid.
 In Ace Combat 4: Shattered Skies, the narrator frequently spends his time in a bar named "Sky Kid".
 In Ace Combat 5: The Unsung War, the character Chopper has a poster with Red Baron's aircraft on it in his room.
 In Ace Combat 6: Fires of Liberation, there is a fighter squadron named "Sky Kid Squadron", with 3 of its pilots having the callsigns "Sky Kid", "Red Baron" and "Blue Max".

Notes

References

External links
Japanese Wii Virtual Console page
 

1985 video games
Arcade video games
Bandai Namco Entertainment franchises
Namco arcade games
Nintendo Entertainment System games
Nintendo Switch games
PlayStation 4 games
Horizontally scrolling shooters
Video games developed in Japan
Virtual Console games for Wii U
Hamster Corporation games